The government of Indonesia defines a metropolitan area as an urban agglomeration where its spatial planning is prioritised due to its highly important influence on the country. The metropolitan areas in Indonesia are managed based on Presidential Regulation (Peraturan Presiden). The national government has established 10 metropolitan areas across the country, anchored by the cities of Jakarta, Surabaya, Bandung, Semarang, Medan, Makassar, Palembang, Denpasar, Banjarmasin, and Manado. Despite having no official metropolitan areas recognised on national level, there are several cities whose urbanisation exceeds their city limits such as Yogyakarta, Malang, and Cirebon.

Official metropolitan areas

Built-up urban areas
The followings are the contiguous urban areas in Indonesia, with a population of over one million, according to Demographia's "World Urban Areas" study. Demographia defines an urban area (urbanised area agglomeration or urban centre) as a continuously built up land mass of urban development that is within a labor market (metropolitan area), without regard for administrative boundaries (city).

See also
List of Indonesian cities by population
List of largest cities

References

External links
Menteri Bambang Beri Arahan Pengelolaan 10 Wilayah Metropolitan Indonesia

Indonesia, List of cities
Metropolitan areas
Indonesia